Yellow Asphalt (Asfalt Tzahov) is a 2000 Israeli film depicting Jahalin Bedouins and their way of life, specifically their conflict with Israeli Jews. The film is a pastiche of three short stories depicted sequentially:
Black spot (Moshe Ivgi, Zevik Raz) – about an Israeli tanker crew which runs over a Bedouin boy
Here is not there (Tatjana Blacher, Abed Zuabi) – about the doomed love of a German woman and her Bedouin husband
Red roofs (Raida Adon, Sami Samir, Motti Katz) – about a love affair / physical relationship of an Israeli Jewish farmer and his Bedouin maid

The stories are shot on location in the Judean desert, and casts members of the Jahalin Bedouin tribe in acting roles. The three shorts are woven together by the presence of the same village elders in all the films, who happen to be actual members of the Jahalin Bedouin. The film was released with Hebrew and Arabic audio tracks. The entire film took seven years to create. The film tries to portray the clash of civilizations between the Bedouins and Israeli Jews in a non-judgmental manner.

Shot before the Second Intifada, the film steers clear of political themes, focusing instead on social issues.
yellow asphalt is the first Israeli film which was remade in Hollywood under the name - before the rains.

Plots

Black spot
A Bedouin boy is run over by an Israeli tanker while crossing the highway with his donkey. The truck driver and his help decide to move the body to the side of the road, and flee. The truck's self ignition fails, and by the time they repair it, they are surrounded by Bedouins. The tense, almost wordless stand-off is broken when the truck help, under orders from the truck driver, removes an extra wheel from the truck and gives it to the Bedouins to pass judgment on.

Here is not there
A council of village elders meet to discuss the marital problems of a Bedouin man and his German wife. The wife, who wants to leave with her two children back to Germany, is instructed to go back to her tent and her family. She decides to escape in the middle of the night with her two children. She runs most of the night - carrying her younger child, and leading her older one - before falling asleep exhausted. She is discovered in the morning by her husband who pursues her with a 4WD across the desert wadis. She intercepts an Israeli truck, and is helped by the truck driver, but her husband realizes she is hiding in the truck when he overhears his children crying inside it. The wife takes flight with the children, but is ultimately pursued down by the husband and stoned.

This entire episode turns out to be a cautionary daydream of the German wife in question, who ultimately decides to leave in the middle of the night with her two children anyway.

Red roofs
A Palestinian housekeeper, wife of a Bedouin leader, is a concubine of an Israeli Jewish farmer with wife and children of his own. When news of her infidelity reaches her husband via Bedouin children who spotted her making love in the desert, he beats her up. The housekeeper decides to seek shelter at the farmer's place based on his assurances that he would look after her. However, the farmer decides to avoid trouble with the Bedouin tribe and asks his Bedouin farmyard help to kill the woman and dispose of the body and gun. The help is unable to kill her, and takes the housekeeper to an unspecified Israeli city - letting her go and telling her not to come back. She does come back, and is shot dead by the farmer. The help deposes of the body and gun inefficiently, leading to the discovery of both. A blood feud is thus inadvertently started between the family of the housekeeper and that of the farmyard help. The help ultimately undergoes the primeval "fire test" to prove his innocence, but tells the Bedouin elders about the guilt of the Israeli farmer. The Bedouin help is excommunicated from his clan, but given a chance to redeem himself by killing the Israeli farmer. He fails to do so, and the Israeli farmer is shown being pursued by the brother of the housekeeper. The final scene shows the farmyard help, an outcast from his society, hitching a ride into the same Israeli city, with words he had used to chide the housekeeper about living in two disparate worlds playing in the background.

See also
The story Red Roofs was the basis of the 2007 film Before the Rains, which was shot on location in Kerala, India.

Awards
Best film - Haifa International Film Festival, 2000
Won, Special Jury Prize, Cologne Mediterranean Film Festival, 2001
Nominated, Best Cinematography, Award of the Israeli Film Academy, 2000
Nominated, Best Screenplay, Award of the Israeli Film Academy, 2000
Nominated for 6 Ophir Awards (Israeli Academy of Film and Television).

References
NYT review, March 13, 2002

External links 
 

Israeli drama films
Arabic-language films
Hebrew-language films
2000s English-language films